These are the official results of the Men's Discus Throw event at the 1982 European Championships in Athens, Greece, held at the Olympic Stadium "Spiros Louis" on 10 and 11 September 1982.

Medalists

Results

Final
11 September

Qualification
10 September

Participation
According to an unofficial count, 24 athletes from 13 countries participated in the event.

 (1)
 (1)
 (2)
 (2)
 (2)
 (1)
 (2)
 (1)
 (2)
 (3)
 (3)
 (1)
 (3)

See also
 1978 Men's European Championships Discus Throw (Prague)
 1980 Men's Olympic Discus Throw (Moscow)
 1983 Men's World Championships Discus Throw (Helsinki)
 1984 Men's Olympic Discus Throw (Los Angeles)
 1986 Men's European Championships Discus Throw (Stuttgart)
 1987 Men's World Championships Discus Throw (Rome)
 1988 Men's Olympic Discus Throw (Seoul)

References

 Results

Discus throw
Discus throw at the European Athletics Championships